Henry Lamar may refer to:

 Henry Graybill Lamar (1798–1861), United States Representative, lawyer and jurist from Georgia
 Henry Lamar (American football) (1906–1985), American college boxing coach, college football coach, and boxing executive
 Tillie Lamar (Henry Cummings Lamar, 1865–1891), college football player